Brech is a commune in the Morbihan department, region of Brittany, northwestern France.

Population
Inhabitants of Brec'h are called in French Brechois.

Breton language
In 2008, 19.56% of primary-school children attended bilingual schools.

See also
Communes of the Morbihan department

References

External links
Official site 

Mayors of Morbihan Association 

Communes of Morbihan